Herne Windmill is a Grade I listed smock mill in Herne, Kent, England, that was built in 1789.

History

Herne Windmill  was built by John Holman in 1789 when he was working for Sweetlove, the Wingham millwright. There are records of a windmill in Herne as early as 1405. The mill replaced an earlier post mill that was standing in 1511 and was marked on Philip Symonson's map of 1596, John Speed's map of 1611, Robert Morden's map of 1695, Emanuel Bowen's map of 1736 and Andrews, Drury and Herbert's map of 1769. In 1858, the mill was raised, and a two-storey brick base built underneath it. A new iron worm was fitted in 1931, replacing the old wooden one. In the 1930s, the mill was working on two sails only. Frank Wootton, the miller, sought the assistance of the Society for the Protection of Ancient Buildings (SPAB), and after Rex Wailes made a report on the mill, two sails from the Black Mill, Forncett End, Norfolk were fitted by Thomas Hunt of Soham, Cambridgeshire in 1936. A new pair of sails was constructed by Hunt, the work being made possible by support from SPAB, the Duchess of Kent and Trinity House. The latter assisted as the mill was marked as a navigational landmark for shipping. The mill worked by wind until 1952, assisted latterly by a steam engine, then an oil engine. After that date, milling was done with an electric motor supplying the power. Milling continued with the electric motor until 1980.

Description

Herne Mill has a three-storey smock on a two-storey brick base. It has four double patent sails carried on a cast-iron windshaft, housed in a Kentish-style cap. The mill is winded by a fantail. There is a stage at a level between the first and second floor. The Brake Wheel is composite, with an iron centre and a wooden rim. It drives a wooden compass arm Wallower on a wooden Upright Shaft. This carries a wooden compass arm Great Spur Wheel. The mill drives three pairs of millstones overdrift.

New sails were fitted in 2004. The work was carried out by IJP Millwrights of Binfield Heath, Berkshire.

On May 21, 2020. The sails were removed since the first lockdown of the COVID-19 pandemic.

Millers

Webb
(Job) Lawrence & Sons (John and Edward) 1795 - 1879
John Lawrence (nephew of Job) 1763 - 1840
Edward Lawrence 1845 -
Thomas Wootton 1879 - 1928
Frank Wootton
 R C & E E Wootton
Clive Wootton 1925 - 1980
Robert Wootton

References for above:-

References

External links

Kent Windmills - information on visiting the mill
Windmill World page on the mill.

Windmills in Kent
Grinding mills in the United Kingdom
Smock mills in England
Tourist attractions in Kent
Grade I listed buildings in Kent
Windmills completed in 1789
Museums in the City of Canterbury
Mill museums in England
Octagonal buildings in the United Kingdom
1789 establishments in England